The University of Northwestern Ohio (UNOH) is a private university in Lima, Ohio. Founded in 1920, it has approximately 4,500 students pursuing degrees in various fields. The university is approved by the Ohio Department of Education and accredited by the Higher Learning Commission. It offers master's degrees, bachelor's degrees, and associate degrees in over 50 programs. The president of the university is Jeff Jarvis.

History 
 Northwestern School of Commerce (1920–1970), located at North Elizabeth Street in Lima, Ohio
 Northwestern Business College (1970–1974)
 Moved to Cable Road campus (1972)
 Northwestern Business College-Technical Center (1974–1990)
 Northwestern College (1990–2000)
 University of Northwestern Ohio as of August 1, 2000

Academics
The university is organized into five colleges:
 College of Business offers master's, bachelor's and associate degrees
 College of Occupational Professions offers bachelor's and associate degrees
 College of Health Professions offers bachelor's and associate degrees
 College of Applied Technologies offers bachelor's and associate degrees, as well as diplomas and post-associate certificate programs
 Graduate College offers a Master of Business Administration degree

The university is accredited by the Higher Learning Commission and approved by the Ohio Department of Higher Education. Specific programs at the institution are accredited by the Commission on Accreditation of Allied Health Education Programs, National Automotive Technicians Education Foundation, or Partnership for Air Conditioning Heating Refrigeration Accreditation – Air-Conditioning Refrigeration Institute. In 1994, the University of Northwestern Ohio was designated by the United States Department of Energy as one of six original Alternate Fuels training facilities in the United States. It is also a National Alternative Fuels Training Consortium Training Center.

Student life
Northwestern Ohio is home to four dorm communities: College Park, Northwestern Park, Sherwood Park, and Racers Village. The dorms are apartment-style and feature bedrooms, common living areas, and some have kitchens and laundry facilities.  The UNOH Indoor Athletic Complex is located on Cable Road across from the Campus and free for use by all current students.  There is also Racers Station which serves as a home base for all student activities on campus such as movie nights, pool tournaments, dances, club meetings, and special events like Oktoberfest, May Daze, Welcome Week and more. Students can join several clubs such as the Race Club, Off-road Club, American Marketing Association, Optimist Club, Rotaract Chapter, Drag Club, and many more.

Honor societies
 Kappa Beta Delta International Business Honor Society 
 National Technical Honor Society

Athletics
The Northwestern Ohio (UNOH) athletic teams are called the Racers. The university is a member of the National Association of Intercollegiate Athletics (NAIA), primarily competing in the Wolverine–Hoosier Athletic Conference (WHAC) since the 2010–11 academic year. The Racers previously competed as a member of the defunct American Mideast Conference from 2008–09 to 2009–10; and as an NAIA Independent during the 2007–08 school year (when it debuted its athletics program and joined the NAIA). The school colors are burgundy and gray.

UNOH competes in 17 intercollegiate varsity sports: Men's sports include baseball, basketball, bowling, golf, soccer and tennis; while women's sports include basketball, bowling, golf, soccer, softball, tennis, and volleyball; and co-ed sports include cheerleading and three motorsports teams that race stock, modified, or drag-style cars.

References

External links
 
 Official athletics website

 
Private universities and colleges in Ohio
University of Northwestern Ohio
Education in Allen County, Ohio
Buildings and structures in Allen County, Ohio